Events from the year 1815 in France.

Incumbents
Monarch – 
 Abdicated 20 March: Louis XVIII
 20 March – 22 June: Napoleon I
 22 June – 7 July: Napoleon II
 Starting 8 July: Louis XVIII
Prime Minister –
 9 July – 26 September: Charles Maurice de Talleyrand-Périgord
 Starting 26 September: Armand-Emmanuel de Vignerot du Plessis, Duc de Richelieu

Events
3 January - Austria, Britain, and Bourbon-restored France form a secret defensive alliance treaty against Prussia and Russia.
26 February - Napoleon escaped from Elba.
1 March - Napoleon lands at Antibes.
20 March - Napoleon arrives back in Paris, ending the First Restoration of Louis XVIII of France.
22 April - Constitutional Referendum held.
22 April - Charter of 1815 signed bringing in a new French constitution.
1 May - Explorer Jules Dumont d'Urville marries Adèle Dumont D'Urville (née Pepin) in Toulon.
16 June - Battle of Quatre Bras, inconclusive result.
16 June - Battle of Ligny, French defeat Prussian forces.
18 June - Battle of Waterloo, decisive defeat of French forces.
18 June-19 June - Battle of Wavre, inconclusive result.
24 June - Napoleon announces his abdication.
28 June - Battle of La Suffel, French victory over Austrian forces.
1 July - Battle of Rocquencourt, French victory over Prussian forces.
3 July - Battle of Issy, French defeat by Prussian forces.
8 July - Louis XVIII of France returns.
15 July - Napoleon I surrenders and is transported to England.
14 August - Elections to Chamber of Deputies produces a heavy ultra-royalist majority.
3 October - Fall of the Mars meteorite Chassigny in Chassigny, Haute-Marne.
7 October - Chamber of Deputies (Chambre introuvable) first assembles.
15 October - Napoleon begins exile on Saint Helena in the Atlantic Ocean.
20 November - Treaty of Paris signed following defeat and second abdication of Napoleon.

Births

January to June
21 February - Jean-Louis-Ernest Meissonier, painter and sculptor (died 1891)
24 February - Jules Achille Noël, painter (died 1881)
12 March - Louis Jules Trochu, soldier and statesman (died 1896)
28 March - Arsène Houssaye, novelist and poet (died 1896)
8 April - Edmond Henri Adolphe Schérer, theologian, critic and politician (died 1889)
9 April - Alphonse Beau de Rochas, engineer (died 1893)
13 April - Félix Esquirou de Parieu, statesman (died 1893)
25 April - Jean-François Jarjavay, anatomist and surgeon (died 1868)
27 April - Alexandre Martin, socialist statesman (died 1895)
5 May - Eugène Marin Labiche, dramatist (died 1888)
8 May - Jean-Delphin Alard, violinist (died 1888)

July to December
6 July - Louis Pierre Gratiolet, anatomist and zoologist (died 1865)
24 July - Arnaud-Michel d'Abbadie, geographer (died 1893)
16 August - Madame Céleste, actress (died 1882)
26 August - Bernard Jauréguiberry, Admiral and statesman (died 1887)
3 December - Louis de Loménie, scholar, essayist and biographer (died 1878)
21 December - Thomas Couture, painter and teacher (died 1879)

Full date unknown
Jean Baptiste Prosper Bressant, actor (died 1886)
Jacques-Eugène Feyen, painter (died 1908)
Louis Dominique Girard, hydraulic engineer (died 1871)
Honoré Jacquinot, surgeon and zoologist (died 1887)

Deaths

January to June
11 January - Jean-Baptiste de Caffarelli du Falga, churchman (born 1763)
15 January - Emma, Lady Hamilton, mistress of Horatio Nelson (born 1765 in Great Britain)
18 January - Stanislas de Boufflers, statesman and writer (born 1738)
12 February - Étienne Marie Antoine Champion de Nansouty, General (born 1768)
17 April - Charles de la Bédoyère, General (born 1786)
1 June - Louis Alexandre Berthier, Marshal of France (born 1753)
18 June - Claude-Etienne Michel, General (born 1772)
18 June - Guillaume Philibert Duhesme, General (born 1766)

July to December
2 August - Guillaume Marie Anne Brune, Marshal of France (born 1763)
14 August - Jean Auguste de Chastenet de Puységur, Bishop (born 1740)
20 September - Nicolas Desmarest, geologist (born 1725)
13 October - Joachim Murat, Marshal of France, brother-in-law of Napoleon (born 1767)
22 October - Claude Lecourbe, General (born 1759)
11 November - Pierre-Louis Ginguené, author (born 1748)
7 December - Michel Ney, Marshal of France (born 1769)

Full date unknown
Geneviève Brossard de Beaulieu, painter
Philippe Henri, Comte de Grimoard, soldier and military writer (born 1753)

See also

References

1810s in France